George Rolfe Humphries (November 20, 1894 in Philadelphia, Pennsylvania – April 22, 1969 in Redwood City, California) was a poet, translator, and teacher.

Life
An alumnus of Towanda High School, Humphries graduated cum laude from Amherst College in 1915. He was a first lieutenant machine gunner in World War I, from 1917 to 1918.  In 1925, he married Helen Ward Spencer.

He taught Latin in secondary schools in San Francisco, New York City, and Long Island through 1957. From 1957 to 1965, he taught at Amherst College and at many poetry and creative writing workshops, including the University of New Hampshire Writers' Conference and the University of Colorado Writers' Conference. A mentor to many poets, including Theodore Roethke. he counted among his literary friendships those with Louise Bogan, Edmund Wilson, and Elizabeth Bishop. His work appeared in Harper's and The New Yorker,

Humphries may be best remembered for a notorious literary prank. Asked to contribute a piece to Poetry in 1939, he penned 39 lines containing an acrostic. The first letters of each line spelled out the message: "Nicholas Murray Butler is a horses ass." The editor printed an apology and Humphries was banned from the publication. The ban was lifted in 1941.

His papers are held at Amherst College.

Spain
Like many American intellectuals, Humphries supported the Republican (left-wing) side in the Spanish Civil War. He was the main organizer of a fund-raising volume, ...And Spain Sings. Fifty Loyalist Ballads (1937). He translated two volumes of poetry of Federico García Lorca, a Spanish homosexual poet assassinated at the beginning of that war and an icon of what Spain lost. Because of controversy surrounding the text of the first of those books, Humphries' correspondence with William Warder Norton, Louise Bogan, and others was published by Daniel Eisenberg (es) (in Spanish translation). Eisenberg praises Humphries as a textual scholar.<ref>Daniel Eisenberg, Poeta en Nueva York. Historia y problemas de un texto de Lorca, Barcelona, Ariel, 1976, http://www.cervantesvirtual.com/obra-visor/poeta-en-nueva-york---historia-y-problemas-de-un-texto-de-lorca-0/html/ffcd511c-82b1-11df-acc7-002185ce6064_24.html.</ref>

Awards
 1938 Guggenheim Fellow in creative writing 
 1955 Academy of American Poets' Fellowship

Works

Poetry
 
 
 
 
 
 
 
 
 
 
 

Translations
 
  Virgil's Aeneid via HathiTrust
 
 
 
 
 

Non-fiction
 
 
 

Musical
 Adelante, 1939 

Edition
 ...And Spain Sings. Fifty Loyalist Ballads. New York, Vanguard Press, 1937. (With M. J. Benardete.) From WorldCat: ""Adaptations by Edna St. Vincent Millay, George Dillon, Genevieve Taggard, Muriel Rukeyser, William Carlos Williams, Jean Starr Untermeyer, Shaemas O'Sheel, Ruth Lechlitner, and other poets."—Dust jacket cover."

Reviews
W. H. Auden called Humphries' translation of Virgil's Aeneid'' "a service for which no public reward could be too great."

References

External links
 
 
Rolfe Humphries page at The Poetry Foundation
Rolfe Humphries (AC 1915) Papers from the Amherst College Archives & Special Collections

1894 births
1969 deaths
Writers from Philadelphia
American male poets
Amherst College alumni
Amherst College faculty
Spanish Civil War
20th-century American poets
Translators of Virgil
20th-century American male writers
Members of the American Academy of Arts and Letters